Mount Geoffrey Regional Nature Park is regional park in British Columbia, Canada, located on Hornby Island.

There are facilities for hiking, mountain biking, and horseback riding.

See also
Mount Geoffrey Escarpment Provincial Park
Tribune Bay Provincial Park

References

External links
 

Parks in British Columbia
Gulf Islands